|}
{| class="collapsible collapsed" cellpadding="0" cellspacing="0" style="clear:right; float:right; text-align:center; font-weight:bold;" width="280px"
! colspan="3" style="border:1px solid black; background-color: #77DD77;" | Also Ran

The 2011 Epsom Derby was the 232nd running of the Derby horse race which took place at Epsom Downs Racecourse, England, on 4 June 2011.

The race was won by second-favourite Pour Moi, the first Derby winner to have been trained in France since Empery in 1976.

The winning horse was ridden by jockey Mickael Barzalona and was trained by André Fabre. Pour Moi beat Treasure Beach by a head; Carlton House, the pre-race favourite at 5/2, finished third by three-quarters of a length. Carlton House was owned by Elizabeth II.

Race details
 Sponsor: Investec
 Winner's prize money: £709,625
 Going: Good to firm (good in places)
 Number of runners: 13
 Winner's time: 2 minutes, 34.54 seconds

Full result

* The distances between the horses are shown in lengths or shorter; hd = head, nk = neck.† Trainers are based in Great Britain unless indicated.

Winner details
Further details of the winner, Pour Moi:

 Foaled: 10 January 2008, in Ireland
 Sire: Montjeu; Dam: Gwynn (Darshaan)
 Owner: Sue Magnier, Michael Tabor and Derrick Smith
 Breeder: Lynch Bages, Ltd.

Form analysis

Two-year-old races
Notable runs by the future Derby participants as two-year-olds in 2010:
 Treasure Beach – 3rd in Royal Lodge Stakes
 Native Khan – 1st in Solario Stakes; 4th in Racing Post Trophy
 Recital – 1st in Critérium de Saint-Cloud
 Masked Marvel – 6th in Autumn Stakes
 Pisco Sour – 2nd in Tattersalls Millions 2YO Trophy; 8th in Critérium International
 Seville – 2nd in Racing Post Trophy
 Castlemorris King – 5th in Champagne Stakes

The road to Epsom
Early-season appearances in 2011 and trial races prior to running in the Derby:
 Pour Moi – 3rd in Prix La Force; 1st in Prix Greffulhe
 Treasure Beach – 1st in Chester Vase
 Carlton House – 1st in Dante Stakes
 Memphis Tennessee – 2nd in Derrinstown Stud Derby Trial
 Native Khan – 1st in Craven Stakes; 3rd in 2,000 Guineas Stakes
 Recital – 3rd in Ballysax Stakes; 1st in Derrinstown Stud Derby Trial
 Vadamar – 1st in Prix François Mathet; 3rd in Prix Greffulhe
 Masked Marvel – 5th in Sandown Classic Trial; 1st in Cocked Hat Stakes
 Pisco Sour – 3rd in Dante Stakes
 Seville – 2nd in Dante Stakes
 Ocean War – 1st in Newmarket Stakes
 Marhaba Malyoon – 6th in Lingfield Derby Trial

Subsequent Group 1 wins
Group 1 / Grade I victories after running in the Derby:
 Treasure Beach – Irish Derby (2011), Secretariat Stakes (2011)
 Masked Marvel - St. Leger Stakes (2011)

Subsequent breeding careers
Leading progeny of participants in the 2011 Epsom Derby.

Sires of Classic winners
Pour Moi (1st)
 Wings Of Eagles - 1st Epsom Derby (2017)
 Sacred Elixir - 1st J. J. Atkins (2016)
 Rosenpurpur - 3rd Deutsches Derby (2017)
 Coeur de Lion - 2nd Triumph Trial Juvenile Hurdle (2016)

Other Stallions
Treasure Beach (2nd) - Exported to America - Shuttles to Argentina where sire of multiple Grade 1 winnersMasked Marvel (8th) - Jumps winnersCarlton House (3rd) - Exported to AustraliaMemphis Tennessee (4th) -Exported to ArgentinaNative Khan (5th) - Exported to TurkeyRecital (6th) - Minor jumps runners - Exported to ArgentinaSeville (10th) - Exported to America

References

 
 sportinglife.com

Epsom Derby
 2011
Epsom Derby
Epsom Derby
2010s in Surrey